The Canton of Roubaix-Est is a former French canton, located in the Nord department in the former region of Nord-Pas-de-Calais (now part of Hauts-de-France).

Composition 
The canton of Roubaix-Est consisted of two communes of Roubaix and Wattrelos. It had 31,644 inhabitants (municipal population) as of January 1, 2012.

History 
The canton of Roubaix-Est was created in 1867, by dividing the former canton of Roubaix.

Mehdi Massrour (PS) was the last general councilor elected from canton, since 2011.

References

See also 

 List of former cantons of France

Former cantons of Nord (French department)
2015 disestablishments in France
States and territories disestablished in 2015